Loree or Lorée may refer to:

People

As a surname
Anne Loree, Canadian songwriter
Brad Loree, Canadian actor and stuntman
James M. Loree, American business executive
Leonor F. Loree, American railroad executive

As a given name
Richard Loree Anderson, American econometrician
LoreeJon Hasson, American billiard player
Loree Marlowe Moore, American basketball player
Loree Murray, American activist
Loree Rackstraw, American critic and memoirist
Loree Rodkin, American jewelry designer
Loree Smith, American hammer thrower
Loree K. Sutton, American general and politician

Places
Loree, Alabama
Loree, Indiana

Companies
F. Lorée, a French musical-instrument manufacturer

Film
Leo and Loree (1980)

See also
Laurie (disambiguation)
Lawry
Lorre (disambiguation)
Lowery
Lowry (disambiguation)